Tadaaki (written: , , , ,  or ) is a masculine Japanese given name. Notable people with the name include:

, Japanese daimyō
, Japanese sumo wrestler
, Japanese table tennis player
, Japanese footballer
, Japanese samurai
, Japanese samurai
, Japanese footballer
, Japanese samurai and daimyō
, Japanese writer
, Japanese daimyō
, Japanese daimyō
, Japanese daimyō
, Japanese conductor

Japanese masculine given names